Belforte all'Isauro is a comune (municipality) in the Province of Pesaro e Urbino in the Italian region Marche, located about  west of Ancona and about  southwest of Pesaro.

Belforte all'Isauro borders the following municipalities: Carpegna, Piandimeleto, Sant'Angelo in Vado, Sestino.

References

Cities and towns in the Marche